Mary Goble Pay (1843–1913) was an early settler of both Nephi, Utah, and Leamington, Utah.

Born Mary Goble in Brighton, Sussex, England, on June 2, 1843 she joined the Church of Jesus Christ of Latter-day Saints along with her parents in 1855. In 1856 they traveled on the Horizon and then in Iowa City joined the Hunt Wagon Company, which traveled along with the Martin Handcart Company.

On the journey west her mother and two siblings died. She also met Richard Pay, whose wife and newborn daughter died during the journey. On arriving in Utah, Goble had her toes cut off due to frostbite. In the spring of 1859 she moved to Nephi, Utah, and shortly afterwards married Richard Pay.

During the Black Hawk War Pay learned the local Ute dialect from the wife of Pawania the head of the local Pagwats band. In 1880 the Pays moved to Leamington, Utah, where Mary served for twelve years as president of the local LDS Primary. The Pays had a total of thirteen children. After Richard died on April 18th, 1893, Mary moved back to Nephi.

Pay is an ancestor of Marjorie Pay Hinckley. The home the Pays built in Leamington was moved to This Is the Place Heritage Park in Salt Lake City in 2001.

Sources
 
article on Pay Home
biography of Pay
Richard H. Cracroft and Neal E. Lambert (ed.), A Believing People: Literature of The Latter-day Saints. (Provo: Brigham Young University Press, 1974) p. 143-50.

References

1843 births
Converts to Mormonism
English leaders of the Church of Jesus Christ of Latter-day Saints
English emigrants to the United States
Mormon pioneers
People from Nephi, Utah
People from Leamington, Utah
1913 deaths
Primary (LDS Church) people